The False Road is a 1920 American silent drama film directed by Fred Niblo. A copy of the film is preserved at the Library of Congress.

Plot
As described in a film publication, Betty Palmer (Bennett) is in a New York criminal gang. Her sweetheart, Roger Moran (Hughes), completes a two-year sentence at Sing Sing and surprises her when he announces at a banquet the gang gives in honor of his return that he is going straight. She refuses to leave her pals in the gang, so he leaves her and finally obtains work at a local bank in a small New England town. Later, the gang leader sends Betty and a confederate to rob the bank. Roger follows them back to New York and, by posing as a backslider, succeeds through Betty in recovering the stolen cash. Betty then abandons the life of crime and marries the man of her heart.

Cast
 Enid Bennett as Betty Palmer
 Lloyd Hughes as 'Pickpocket' Roger Moran
 Wade Boteler as 'Sapphire' Mike Wilson
 Lucille Young as 'Frisco' Minnie
 Charles Smiley as Joshua Starbuck
 Edith Yorke as Mother Starbuck
 Gordon Mullen as Crook Chauffeur

References

External links

1920 films
1920 drama films
Silent American drama films
American silent feature films
American black-and-white films
Films directed by Fred Niblo
1920s American films